Drug Metabolism and Disposition is a peer-reviewed scientific journal covering the fields of pharmacology and toxicology. It was established in 1973 and is published monthly by the American Society for Pharmacology and Experimental Therapeutics. The journal publishes articles on in vitro and in vivo studies of the metabolism, transport, and disposition of drugs and environmental chemicals, including the expression of drug-metabolizing enzymes and their regulation. , the editor-in-chief is XinXin Ding.

All issues are available online as PDFs, with text versions additionally available from 1997. Content from 1997 is available freely 12 months after publication.

History
Drug Metabolism and Disposition was established in 1973 by Kenneth C. Leibman. The initial frequency was bimonthly (six annual issues); it increased to monthly in 1995. The journal was published on behalf of the society by Williams & Wilkins until the end of 1996.

Abstracting and indexing
According to the Journal Citation Reports, Drug Metabolism and Disposition received a 2020 impact factor of 3.922.  The journal is abstracted and indexed in the following databases:

BIOSIS Previews
Chemical Abstracts
Chemical Abstracts Service
Current Contents/Life Sciences
EMBASE
MEDLINE
META
Science Citation Index

References

External links
 

Pharmacology journals
Monthly journals
English-language journals
Publications established in 1973
Delayed open access journals
Toxicology journals